Telecommunications in Dominica comprises telephone, radio, television and internet services. The primary regulatory authority is the National Telecommunication Regulatory Commission which regulates all related industries to comply with The Telecommunications Act 8 of 2000.

Telephony
Calls from Dominica to the US, Canada, and other NANP Caribbean nations, are dialed as 1 + NANP area code + 7-digit number. Calls from Dominica to non-NANP countries are dialed as 011 + country code + phone number with local area code.

Telephone system
Domestic: fully automatic network
International: microwave radio relay and SHF radiotelephone links to Martinique and Guadeloupe; VHF and UHF radiotelephone links to Saint Lucia

Number formatting
Telephone code: 767
Number Format: nxx-xxxx
Country Code: +1767
International Call Prefix: 011 (outside NANP)

Mobile cellular service providers
Digicel
LIME

Radio

Radio broadcast stations
AM 0, FM 15, shortwave 0 (2007)

Radios
46,000 (1997)

Television

Television broadcast stations
0 (however, there are three cable television companies, Dominica Broadcast, Marpin Telecoms and Digicel Play – a merger of Digicel and SAT Telecommunications Ltd.)

Televisions
11,000 (2007)

Internet service providers
Internet Service Providers (ISPs)
Cable & Wireless Dominica Ltd (DSL)
Digicel Play (Cable & FTTP)
Marpin Telecoms (Cable)

Internet code .dm

References

External links
 
 Dominica, E.C. Tel
 Dominica, SubmarineCableMap.com

Dominica

Dominica